The Differend: Phrases in Dispute is a 1983 book by the French philosopher Jean-François Lyotard.

Summary
In The Differend, based on Immanuel Kant's views on the separation of Understanding, Judgment, and Reason, Lyotard identifies the moment in which language fails as the differend, and explains it as follows: "...the unstable state and instant of language wherein something which must be able to be put into phrases cannot yet be… the human beings who thought they could use language as an instrument of communication, learn through the feeling of pain which accompanies silence (and of pleasure which accompanies the invention of a new idiom)". Lyotard undermines the common view that the meanings of phrases can be determined by what they refer to (the referent). The meaning of a phrase—an event (something happens)--cannot be fixed by appealing to reality (what actually happened). Lyotard develops this view of language by defining "reality" in an original way, as a complex of possible senses attached to a referent through a name. The correct sense of a phrase cannot be determined by a reference to reality, since the referent itself does not fix sense, and reality itself is defined as the complex of competing senses attached to a referent. Therefore, the phrase event remains indeterminate.

Lyotard uses the example of Auschwitz and the revisionist historian Robert Faurisson’s demands for proof of the Holocaust to show how the differend operates as a double bind. Faurisson argued that "the Nazi genocide of 6 million Jewish people was a hoax and a swindle, rather than a historical fact" and that "he was one of the courageous few willing to expose this wicked conspiracy". Faurisson will only accept proof of the existence of gas chambers from eyewitnesses who were themselves victims of the gas chambers. However, any such eyewitnesses are dead and are not able to testify. Either there were no gas chambers, in which case there would be no eyewitnesses to produce evidence, or there were gas chambers, in which case there would still be no eyewitnesses to produce evidence, because they would be dead. Since Faurisson will accept no evidence for the existence of gas chambers, except the testimony of actual victims, he will conclude from both possibilities (gas chambers existed and gas chambers did not exist) that gas chambers did not exist. This presents a double bind. There are two alternatives, either there were gas chambers or there were not, which lead to the same conclusion: there were no gas chambers (and no final solution). The case is a differend because the harm done to the victims cannot be presented in the standard of judgment upheld by Faurisson.

Reception
The Differend is considered, including by Lyotard himself, to be Lyotard's most important work. It has been seen as providing the theoretical basis for much of his later work.

Translations

See also
 Paul de Man

References

Bibliography
Books

 
 

1983 non-fiction books
Aesthetics books
Books by Jean-François Lyotard
French non-fiction books
Les Éditions de Minuit books
Political philosophy literature
University of Minnesota Press books